DJ Shine (born June 11, 1974) is a Korean
Rapper, Producer, DJ formerly associated with popular Korean Hip hop group, Drunken Tiger.

Before he met Tiger JK he performed as a DJ,
in small clubs in New York City and Los Angeles. Shine met JK in a rap event, and they found similar interests and
formed a Hip hop group in Los Angeles. After a successful concert the duo attracted a South Korean Music company, and got signed and debuted as Drunken Tiger, with their debut album in South Korea.

Shine was a member of Drunken Tiger until mid-2005, when Shine left the group due to personal reasons.
After Shine left Drunken Tiger he has focused more on mainstream and poppish than Old School style. Shine also stated in an interview in 2006, that he will release a solo album it has yet to be confirmed. Shine is also the executive producer of music company, K & Music.

On 2006, he produced and wrote a song for the soundtrack for the movie Cinderella titled, Plastic World.
The lyrics are all written in English. Shine also made a Korean version of Flo Rida's hit single, Right Round. Although it cannot be confirmed but Shine has given hints in releasing his solo album very soon.

References
 https://web.archive.org/web/20180419175802/http://www.drunkencamp.com/
 http://www.dt-love.co.kr/
 https://web.archive.org/web/20091207093622/http://www.allkpop.com/index.php/full_story/dj_shine_will_spin_your_head_right_round/

1974 births
Living people
South Korean male songwriters
South Korean DJs
South Korean male rappers
Rappers from New York City
People from Queens, New York
21st-century American rappers
21st-century American male musicians